Zara is a feminine given name and a surname.

It is the English form of the name Zaïre, the central character of Voltaire's 1732 play Zaïre (The Tragedy of Zara)

Its popularity may be influenced by the naming of Princess Anne's daughter Zara Phillips in 1981, and the Spanish fashion store Zara.

Another derivation, unrelated to the above, is the Bulgarian name Zara (Зара) which is a diminutive of Zaharina or Zaharinka.

Notable people with this name

Given name
Zara Noor Abbas (a.k.a. Zara Noor Siddiqui; born 1990), Pakistani actress
Zara Abid (1992–2020), Pakistani model
Zara Aronson (1864–1944), Sydney-based journalist
Zara Backman (1875–1949), Swedish actress
Dame Zara Bate (1909–1989), Australian fashion designer, wife of Harold Holt
Zara Cully (1892–1978), American actress
Zara Salim Davidson (born 1973), Malaysian royal
Zara Davis (born 1966), English windsurfer
Zara Dawson (born 1983), English actress and television presenter
Zara Dolukhanova (1918–2007), Armenian mezzo-soprano singer
Zara DuPont (1869–1946), American suffragist
Zara Glover (born 1982), English ten-pin bowler
Zara Holland, British television personality
Zara Hore-Ruthven, Countess of Gowrie (1879–1965), Anglo-Irish wife of the Earl of Gowrie, Governor-General of Australia
Zara Kay (born 1992), secular activist 
Zara Larsson (born 1997), Swedish singer
Zara Leghissa (born 1970), Swedish politician
Zara Levina (1906–1976), Ukrainian pianist and composer
Zara Long (born 1970), British swimmer.
Zara McDermott (born 1996), British media personality
Zara McFarlane (born 1983), British musician
Zara Mints (1927–1990), Russian-Estonian literary scientist, wife of Yuri Lotman
Zara Mohammed (born c.1991), Scottish faith leader 
Zara Mullooly (born 2002), British Paralympic swimmer
Zara Nakhimovskaya (born 1934), Latvian chess player
Zara Nelsova (1918–2002), Canadian cellist
Zara Northover (born 1984), Jamaican shot putter
Zara Nutley (1926–2016), British television actress
Zara Peerzada (born 1992), Pakistani model
Zara Rutherford (born 2002), Belgian-British aviator
Zara Schmelen (c. 1793–1831), Southern African translator
Zara Sheikh (born 1982), Pakistani model and Lollywood actress
Zara Steiner (1928–2020), American-born British historian and academic
Zara Tindall (née Phillips; born 1981), daughter of Princess Anne of the United Kingdom
Zara Turner (born ca. 1968), British actress
Zara Whites (born 1968), Dutch television personality, activist and former pornographic actress
Zara A. Wilson (1840–?), American reformer and lawyer
Zara Wright (active 1920), American author based in Chicago
Zara Yaqob (1399–1468), Emperor of Ethiopia (1434–1468)

Surname
Adhisty Zara (born 2003), Indonesian singer
Alberto da Zara (1889–1951), Italian admiral
Antonio Zara (died 1621), Roman Catholic prelate 
Bert Zara (active 1969–1975), Australian rugby league player
Christopher Zara (born 1970), American writer
Gregorio Y. Zara (1902–1978), Filipino engineer and physicist
Zdeněk Žára (1932–2002), Czechoslovak rower

Fictional characters
Zara Carmichael in TV series Doctors
Zara Morgan in TV series Hollyoaks
Zara (character), a DC Comics supervillain
Zara Asker, head of CHERUB in the teenage spy novels by Robert Muchamore
Zara Dearborn, antagonist in Queen of Air and Darkness, novel by Cassandra Clare
Zara, the antagonist of the video game Disney Princess: Enchanted Journey.
Zara the Starlight Fairy, a character from the Rainbow Magic book franchise.
Zara Amaro, daughter of Detective Nick Amaro in the TV series Law and Order: Special Victims Unit

See also
Zahra (name)
Zara (disambiguation)

References

Feminine given names